Regions are currently the highest administrative divisions in Morocco. Since 2015, Morocco officially administers 12 regions, including one (Dakhla-Oued Ed-Dahab) that lies completely within the disputed territory of Western Sahara and two (Laâyoune-Sakia El Hamra and Guelmim-Oued Noun) that lie partially within it. The regions are subdivided into a total of 75 second-level administrative divisions, which are prefectures and provinces.

A region is governed by a directly elected regional council. The president of the council is responsible for carrying out the council's decisions. Prior to the 2011 constitutional reforms, this was the responsibility of the Wali, the representative of the central government appointed by the King, who now plays a supporting role in the administration of the region.

Regions since 2015
On 3 January 2010, the Moroccan government established the Consultative Commission for the Regionalization (CCR), which aimed to decentralize power to the regions, and confer a greater autonomy to the regions coinciding with the Western Sahara. The commission published provisional names and numbers for the new regions, and their names were officially fixed in the Bulletin Officiel dated 5 March 2015. The new regional councils elected their presidents on 14 September 2015 and regional governors were appointed on 13 October 2015.

A.Lies partially or completely within the disputed territory of Western Sahara.

1997 to 2010: Full unitary system
Between 1997 and 2010, Morocco had 16 regions.

The entirety of Oued Ed-Dahab-Lagouira (1), the vast majority of Laâyoune-Boujdour-Sakia El Hamra (2), and part of Guelmim-Es Semara (3) were situated within the disputed territory of Western Sahara. The sovereignty of Western Sahara is disputed between Morocco and the Polisario Front which claims the territory as the independent Sahrawi Arab Democratic Republic. Most of the region is administered by Morocco as its Southern Provinces. The Polisario Front, based in headquarters at Tindouf in south western Algeria, controls only those areas east of the Moroccan Wall.

Regions before 1997
Before 1997, Morocco was divided into seven regions: Central, Eastern, North-Central, Northwestern, South-Central, Southern, and Tansift.

See also 
 ISO 3166-2:EH
 ISO 3166-2:MA (2004)

References

External links 
 Administrative divisions of Morocco

Morocco, Regions
Geography of Morocco
Government of Morocco
Morocco, Regions
Morocco geography-related lists
 
Subdivisions of Morocco